Wendy Kingston (born 25 June 1981) is an Australian journalist and television news presenter.

Kingston was previously a presenter of Nine Afternoon News Queensland, as well as other national bulletins from Sydney.

Career
Kingston's media career began in 2000 working as a reporter and newsreader for ABC Radio Brisbane, before moving to ABC Radio Rockhampton. In 2001, she moved to WIN News as reporter and fill-in newsreader for the Toowoomba bulletin. After six-months, Kingston was appointed as full-time presenter of the Toowoomba and Sunshine Coast WIN News bulletins.

In 2005, Kingston resigned from WIN and moved to Sydney, where she was picked up by the Nine Network to report for Nine News in Sydney.

Kingston began presenting the National Nine News: Morning Edition at the start of 2007, replacing Georgie Gardner who moved to Today. In late 2007, she was replaced by then National Nine News: Afternoon Edition presenter Kellie Sloane.

In July 2008, Kingston presented the final bulletin of Nightline. Following this, she was appointed presenter of Nine News PM Edition.

Kingston remained host of Nine Afternoon News until May 2009, when she moved to presenting Nine's Late News. This was due to be the replacement of Nine Afternoon News with This Afternoon, a new news and current affairs program hosted by Andrew Daddo and Katrina Blowers. After Kingston moved to Nine's Late News, the Nine Afternoon News was presented in Melbourne for a 7-week period with various presenters.

In October 2009, Kingston returned to her previous role as the presenter of Nine Afternoon News and in November, she was replaced by Kellie Sloane as presenter of Nightline with Kingston becoming presenter of both Nine Morning News and Nine Afternoon News.

In January 2013, Kingston was appointed presenter of Nine News Now a bulletin that includes a mix of news, sport, panel discussions and showbiz.

In June 2014, Kingston returned from maternity leave and was appointed news presenter on Weekend Today.

In June 2016, Kingston was appointed presenter of Nine Gold Coast News alongside Bruce Paige.

In September 2018, it was announced that Wendy and Eva Milic would swap roles with Kingston being appointed Nine Live Queensland presenter and Milic moving to present Nine Gold Coast News.

In July 2021, Kingston resigned from the Nine Network to spend more time with her children, her last day was on 17 August.

Personal life
Kingston graduated from Somerset College on the Gold Coast in 1998, and attended Bond University, where she obtained a degree in Journalism in 2003.

Kingston is divorced from her first husband and remarried to Richard Jefferies.

References

External links
Wendy Kingston profile
Nine News

Nine News presenters
Australian women television presenters
Living people
1981 births
People from the Gold Coast, Queensland
WIN News presenters